Woody River is a river in the Canadian provinces of Manitoba and Saskatchewan. The river's source is in the Porcupine Hills and Porcupine Provincial Forest of eastern Saskatchewan. From there it flows south through boreal forest and then east through Boreal Plains in the Parkland Region of Manitoba en route to Swan Lake. The river parallels the Swan River for much of its route as it travels through Swan River Valley between Duck Mountain and Porcupine Hills of the Manitoba Escarpment. Bowsman is the only notable community along the course of Woody River. Several highways cross it, including Saskatchewan's Highway 980, Manitoba's Roads 588, 587, 366, 268, and Manitoba's Highway 10.

Course 
Woody River begins from the southern shore of Woody Lake in Porcupine Hills Provincial Park. The main tributary for Woody Lake is Midnight Creek which has its source deep in the Porcupine Hills and is connected to several lakes in the provincial park, including Isbister, Townsend, Elbow, Spirit, and Island Lakes.

From Woody Lake and Porcupine Provincial Park, Woody River travels south through the RM of Hudson Bay No. 394 and out of Porcupine Hills. It enters the RM of Livingston No. 331 and the Swan River Valley before heading east. The river parallels Swan River, which also has its source in the Porcupine Hills, and it is joined by multiple tributaries, crossed by several highways, and passes through Bowsman, which is at confluence of Woody River and Smith Creek. It empties into the western shore of Swan Lake at Swan Lake First Nation.

Tributaries 
Tributaries of Woody River, from upstream to downstream, include:
Midnight Creek (flows into Woody Lake)
Island Creek
Whitefish Creek (from Whitefish Lake)
Little Fish Creek (into Whitefish Lake)
Smallfish Creek
Rock Creek (into Whitefish Lake)
Mud Creek
McVey Creek
Mink Creek
Hart Creek
Hubbell Creek
Trout Creek
Whitebeech Creek
Smith Creek
Bowsman River
Camp Nine Creek
Mullin Creek
Kemulch Creek
Birch River
Caldon River

Parks and recreation 
At the headwaters of Woody River in Saskatchewan is a portion Porcupine Hills Provincial Park called the Woody River Block. The park is centred around the lakes that make up the source of the river, including Isbister Lake, Townsend Lake, Elbow Lake, Woody Lake, Spirit Lake, Island Lake, and Smallfish Lake. Amenities and activities include camping, fishing, snowmobiling, swimming, and hiking.

Whitefish Lake Provincial Park is a provincial park in Manitoba on Whitefish Lake, which is upstream along Whitefish Creek, a tributary of Woody River. The park has 40-unserviced campsites and lake access for fishing and other watersports.

Fish species 
Fish commonly found in the river include walleye and northern pike.

See also 
List of rivers of Saskatchewan
List of rivers of Manitoba
Tourism in Saskatchewan
Hudson Bay drainage basin
Wood River, a river of a similar name in south-western Saskatchewan

References 

Rivers of Saskatchewan
Rivers of Manitoba
Livingston No. 331, Saskatchewan
Hudson Bay No. 394, Saskatchewan
Parkland Region, Manitoba